Marek Prawda (born 1 October 1956 in Kielce) is a Polish sociologist and diplomat. Since April 2016 he is Head of Representation - Poland at European Commission.

Life 
Prawda studied economics at the University of Leipzig and sociology at the Institute of Philosophy and Sociology of the Polish Academy of Science. In 1979 he obtained a degree in economic studies and in 1984 a PhD degree in sociology. Until 1990 he has been working at the Polish Academy of Science. He was member of Solidarity.

In 1992 he started his diplomatic career as First Secretary to the Embassy of Poland in Bonn, Germany. In 2000 and 2005 he had been Director at the Secretariat of the Minister of Foreign Affairs.

From 2001 to 2005, he served as Ambassador to Sweden, from 2006 to 2012 as Ambassador to Germany and from 2012 to 2016 as Ambassador to the European Union.

In February 2016, Prawda ended his term. In April 2016, he was appointed by Jean-Claude Juncker as Head of the European Representation in Warsaw.
 
While Ambassador to Germany, Prawda has been an important promoters of the German-Polish dialogue. In 2012 he has been awarded the Grand Cross of the Order of Merit of the Federal Republic of Germany and the Order of Merit of Brandenburg.

Prawda has published a number of articles on Polish-German relations in newspapers and magazines.

Works

References

External links 

 bloomberg.com: Marek Prawda Ph.D. (Executive profile & biography)
 Wirtualne Niemcy: Ambasador Marek Prawda kończy pracę w Niemczech (Polish 2012, webpage capture)

1956 births
Living people
Ambassadors of Poland to Germany
Ambassadors of Poland to Sweden
Commanders Crosses of the Order of Merit of the Federal Republic of Germany
Leipzig University alumni
People from Kielce
Permanent Representatives of Poland to the European Union
Polish sociologists
Solidarity (Polish trade union) activists